Waynea is a genus of lichenized fungi in the family Ramalinaceae. It was circumscribed in 1990 by Swedish taxonomist Roland Moberg, with W. californica assigned as the type species.

Species
Waynea adscendens  – Spain
Waynea algarvensis  – Portugal
Waynea californica 
Waynea cretica  – Greece
Waynea giraltiae  – Europe
Waynea hirsuta  – Siberia

References

Ramalinaceae
Lichen genera
Lecanorales genera
Taxa described in 1990